Gornje Punoševce is a village in the municipality of Vranje, Serbia. As of the 2002 census, the village has a population of 40 people.

References

Populated places in Pčinja District